The 2003–04 season was the 118th season in the history of Luton Town Football Club, and club's 83rd consecutive year in the Football League. Luton finished in tenth place, a surprising success considering the financial issues that afflicted the club. Despite being placed in administrative receivership for the majority of the season following a turbulent change of ownership and having a rigorous transfer embargo imposed as a result, signing players only with the Football League's special dispensation, the club accrued more points than in the previous campaign.

The lack of spending power meant that numerous youth team players were promoted to the first-team squad, such as Kevin Foley, Curtis Davies, Keith Keane, and Leon Barnett; as well as players with no previous professional football experience, like Enoch Showunmi. These players would go on to form a crucial part of the Luton side in later years.

This article covers the period from 1 July 2003 to 30 June 2004.

Background

The previous season had seen consolidation for Luton after their drop into the basement division of English league football in 2001, with the club finishing the 2002–03 season in ninth place. Stability did not last for long, however, as the end of the season saw controversy erupt after an unidentified consortium gained control of the club, later revealed to be headed by businessman John Gurney.

Gurney's first act was the sacking of successful managerial duo Joe Kinnear and Mick Harford, subsequently followed by a phone-poll to determine the next manager. Former Luton player and Hartlepool United manager Mike Newell was announced as the winner on 23 June 2003, though it is widely believed that Kinnear accumulated the most votes, only to reject a return to the club as he refused to work with Gurney.

In terms of playing staff, the end of the last season had seen six released; goalkeepers Carl Emberson and Mark Ovendale, defenders Duncan Jupp, Alan Kimble and Aaron Skelton, and striker Carl Griffiths. No replacements had been brought in, leaving Luton with a compact squad, albeit with a number of talented young players.

Review

July
With the fallout surrounding the takeover still occurring, including the fact that players and staff had not been paid for two months, managing director John Gurney was summoned by the Football League to explain the situation. Striker Tony Thorpe voiced his thoughts on the matter, stating that the supporters needed to get behind the players and turn out for the first game of the season, responding to the fact that thousands of fans were deliberately not buying season tickets in an attempt to force the new owners out of the club. Defender Chris Coyne expressed a different view, praising the supporters for standing up for themselves and the club even though it meant he was not being paid.

On 11 July, the Football League met with Gurney and expressed "grave concern that the new owners... have been unable to satisfy [The League] of the club's financial stability going forward." As a result, Luton were placed under a transfer embargo and all payments due to the club from the authorities, such as sponsorship money and television rights, were to be withheld. In the weeks before this, Luton's supporters' trust, Trust in Luton, had devised a strategy to acquire shares in the club's major creditor, Hatters Holdings. Hatters Holdings, now majority-owned by Trust in Luton, deliberately placed the club into administrative receivership on 14 July to successfully force out John Gurney after a turbulent 55 days in charge. As a result, supporters began buying tickets again and the club hastily arranged friendly matches against Fulham, Hitchin Town and an Arsenal XI before the season began on 9 August. Despite ridding the club of Gurney, the club remained financially insecure and still had a transfer embargo in place, meaning Luton could only sign players on free transfers or on loan and, even then, only with dispensation from the authorities.

August and September
After being sacked alongside Joe Kinnear eight weeks earlier, Mick Harford returned to Luton on 6 August as Director of Football. Harford and manager Mike Newell had previously played together at Luton in 1986 and 1987, during the club's most successful period in the top division of English football.

A day before the season began, Luton were granted special dispensation from the Football League to sign a goalkeeper and an outfield player on loan. While the club elected to use youth team goalkeepers Rob Beckwith and Dean Brill, they did sign Portsmouth winger Courtney Pitt on a one-month loan. Pitt played in the opening game against Rushden & Diamonds as Luton won 3–1, Tony Thorpe scoring twice. A 2–1 victory in the next league game over Stockport County left Luton as early leaders of the Second Division.

On 22 August, Tony Thorpe joined Luton's rivals Queens Park Rangers for a £50,000 fee. It proved to be a transfer that angered many Luton supporters due to a combination of Thorpe's comments earlier in the season urging fans to get behind the team, QPR's status as Luton's rivals, and the fact that the club received such a small fee for a player perceived to be worth much more. The same day, as a result of funds being freed up by Thorpe's move, Luton signed young Coventry City striker Gary McSheffrey on a one-month loan.

The next three games saw two losses and a win. On 6 September, the club signed 21-year-old striker Enoch Showunmi on non-contract terms following special dispensation to sign an outfield player after captain Kevin Nicholls was injured for three months. Showunmi, who had no professional football experience and had previously played only for eleventh-tier club Willesden Constantine, had been on trial with Luton since August. Only one further win followed in September, leaving the club in fourteenth place in the table. Both McSheffrey and Pitt signed one-month extensions to their loans in late September, and the club allowed striker Dean Crowe, who had been injured for much of the past year, to join Third Division club York City on loan for a month.

Luton progressed to the second round of the League Cup, where they faced Premier League club Charlton Athletic. After a 4–4 draw at extra-time, earning praise from Charlton manager Alan Curbishley, Luton lost 8–7 on penalties.

October and November
Goalkeeper Rob Beckwith was suspended after being sent off in a 3–0 defeat to Oldham Athletic, meaning Luton had only one goalkeeper in the form of 18-year-old Dean Brill for an upcoming match with Wycombe Wanderers. They signed former player Nathan Abbey on non-contract terms on 10 October from Stevenage Borough to cover Brill's position.

The club endured a mixed month in the league during October, recording two wins, two draws and two losses, including a 6–3 defeat to AFC Bournemouth, as well as progressing to the second round of the Football League Trophy. An injury to regular striker Steve Howard pushed Adrian Forbes into a first-team role, where he excelled with six goals in six games, winning the award for October's top scorer in the division. In terms of transfers, Luton extended Gary McSheffrey's loan for a further month after he had scored eight goals in thirteen games and Nathan Abbey left after two weeks, the club signing experienced goalkeeper Marlon Beresford from Bradford City as a replacement on a three-month contract. Beresford joining meant that a player had to leave to satisfy the transfer embargo, and Courtney Pitt subsequently returned to Portsmouth after two months on loan.

November saw the team go unbeaten in the league, with wins also in the Football League Trophy and FA Cup. Adrian Forbes continued his goalscoring form, hitting four goals in six games as Luton moved to tenth in the table, one point from the play-off places. The successful run of form coincided with welcome news for the club off the pitch, with confirmation from the Companies Court on 21 November that the administrators now had the power to sell the club to an appropriate bidder, safeguarding the future of Luton Town. On 28 November, a bid from a company called Bill Tomlins Sport Management was received, with the administrators intending to meet with representatives in early December to progress the sale.

December and January
The team's good form continued into December, with two wins, a draw and one loss in the league leaving them in seventh place. Southend United knocked the club out of the Football League Trophy early in the month, but Luton did progress to the third round of the FA Cup with a 2–0 win over Rochdale. Gary McSheffrey left the club on 3 December with Luton unable to extend his loan further than the 93-day maximum.

January began with Luton beating Bradford City 2–1 in the FA Cup, ensuring the club reached the fourth round of the competition for the first time since the 1994–95 season. Two consecutive 2–2 draws left the club in ninth place in the league, but a 1–0 defeat to Tranmere Rovers in front of Kenilworth Road's biggest crowd of the season on 24 January knocked Luton out of the FA Cup.

Marlon Beresford left Luton on 26 January at the expiration of his contract, signing for divisional rivals Barnsley. Three days later, Luton signed a replacement in the form of Danish goalkeeper Morten Hyldgaard on a free transfer from Scottish Premier League side Hibernian until the end of the season.

February, March and April
Luton had a strong February in the league, picking up 13 out of a possible 18 points and moving into a play-off position. This set of results saw manager Mike Newell win the Manager of the Month award and striker Enoch Showunmi rewarded as Player of the Month. Earlier in the month, following a hat-trick in a 4–1 win over Brentford, Showunmi had signed a two-and-a-half-year professional contract.

On 13 February, preferred bidder Bill Tomlins stated that he hoped Luton would be out of administration within a week, assuming the handover of the club went smoothly. However, no news was heard for over a month, which only then confirmed that the transfer of ownership of the club was planned to take place on 31 March.

On the pitch, Luton started March in a similar fashion to February with a draw and a win to place themselves in sixth position, just inside the play-offs, with twelve games left to play. However, the club soon slipped down the league, with a loss and two draws pushing them into mid-table. Irish defender Kevin Foley, a regular in the Luton first-team despite officially being classed as a youth player, agreed a two-and-a-half-year professional contract on 10 March.

The end of the month also saw the closure of the transfer window, and the club released striker Dean Crowe, who had made only two starts all season. Crowe subsequently joined Oldham Athletic. With Crowe's wages freed up, Luton signed Rushden & Diamonds captain and left-back Paul Underwood on a free transfer following the League's approval.

In terms of financial issues, the planned date for transfer of ownership on 31 March passed without event, with the future of the club still in the balance. A series of statements throughout April informing that Luton Town would be out of administration "soon" also failed to yield any immediate positive outcome.

A poor run of results saw Luton pick up only one win from seven games in April, with a 2–1 defeat to Wrexham on 24 April confirming that the play-offs were mathematically out of reach.

May and June
A win and loss in the final two games in early May meant that Luton finished the season in tenth place, seven points away from a play-off place. Given the financial constraints placed on the team and chaotic conditions surrounding ownership, the season exceeded most supporter and pundit expectations.

On 12 May Bill Tomlins, head of the consortium buying Luton Town, confirmed the Football League had formally approved the purchase of the club from administrative receivership. Tomlins committed himself to building a new stadium on land purchased by previous chairman Mike Watson-Challis, with plans to open it in 2006. He also praised Trust in Luton for saving the club in July 2003.

Goalkeeper Morten Hyldgaard left the club on 14 May at the expiration of his contract, as did youth players Matthew Judge and Parys Okai. On 21 May, Luton turned down a bid from Sheffield Wednesday for top scorer Steve Howard. Initially, the bid was reported as being accepted, but it later came to light that a forged fax had been sent to Sheffield Wednesday apparently accepting the offer, while the official response from Luton had been to reject it. A day later, defender Chris Coyne and midfielder Steve Robinson both signed two-year contract extensions. On 27 May, youth players Curtis Davies, Rob Beckwith and Stephen O'Leary signed two-year professional contracts, while Michael Leary extended his own professional contract by a further two years. Defender Russell Perrett, who had been injured for the majority of the season, signed a one-year contract extension on 7 June. Ten days later, forward Adrian Forbes left the club on a free transfer to join Swansea City. On 23 June, goalkeeper Marlon Beresford agreed to return to Luton on a free transfer, with the deal taking place on 1 July at the opening of the transfer and player registration window. Midfielder Paul Hughes agreed to a two-year contract extension on 26 June, as Mike Newell continued to commit players to Luton for the next season.

Match results
Luton Town results given first.

Legend

Friendlies

Football League Second Division
All results, goals, attendances etc. taken from Soccerbase and verified with official Luton Town match reports.

FA Cup

Football League Cup

Football League Trophy

League table

Player statistics
Last match played on 8 May 2004. Players with a zero in every column only appeared as unused substitutes.

Managerial statistics
Only competitive games from the 2003–04 season are included.

Awards
Awarded on 2 May 2004.

Transfers

In

Out

Loans in

Loans out

See also
List of Luton Town F.C. seasons

Footnotes

A.  Luton lost 8–7 in a penalty shootout
B.  The goal of the season was awarded to Steve Robinson's strike against Blackpool on 13 December 2003.

References

Luton Town F.C. seasons
Luton Town